is a village located in Akita Prefecture, Japan. , the village had an estimated population of 2,512 in 902 households, and a population density of 12 persons per km2. In 1999, Higashinaruse was selected as one of The Most Beautiful Villages in Japan.

Geography
Higashinaruse is located at the far southeast corner of Akita Prefecture, bordered by Iwate and Miyagi Prefectures to the east. The area is mountainous and forested and parts of the village are within the borders of the Kurikoma Quasi-National Park.

Neighboring municipalities
Akita Prefecture
Yuzawa
Yokote
Miyagi Prefecture
Kurihara
Iwate Prefecture
Ichinoseki
Ōshū
Nishiwaga

Demographics
Per Japanese census data, the population of Higashinaruse peaked at around the year 1950 and has been in steady decline since then.

Climate
Higashinaruse has a humid continental climate (Köppen climate classification Dfa) with large seasonal temperature differences, with warm to hot (and often humid) summers and cold (sometimes severely cold) winters. Precipitation is significant throughout the year, but is heaviest from August to October. The average annual temperature in Higashinaruse is 9.0 °C. The average annual rainfall is 1635 mm with September as the wettest month. The temperatures are highest on average in August, at around 23.1 °C, and lowest in January, at around -3.8 °C.

History
The area of present-day Higashinaruse was part of ancient Ugo Province, dominated by the Satake clan during the Edo period, who ruled Kubota Domain under the Tokugawa shogunate. The village of Higashinaruse was established on April 1, 1889, with the establishment of the modern municipalities system.

Economy
The economy of Higashinaruse is based on agriculture and forestry.

Education
Higashinaruse has one public elementary school and one public middle school operated by the village government. The village does not have a high school.

Transportation

Railway
 The village does not currently have any railway service.

Highway

Noted people from Higashinaruse
Yoshihiro Takahashi,  manga artist

References

External links

 

 
Villages in Akita Prefecture